Hanan Redha (born on August 23, 1991) is a Bahraini singer. Her fan nickname is نجمة الربيع (“Spring Star”).

Biography
Redha was born in Bahrain but has also lived in Kuwait, where she studied at the Higher Institute of Musical Arts and earned a Bachelor of Arts in Music. She came to public attention as a contestant on the second season of Arab Idol and the renowned regional variety show Sawt al-Sahary as well as acting in مواطن قليل الدسم (“Low-Fat Citizen”), a play directed by actress Shatha Sabt.

In late 2015, her single “سمّوا عليه” (“There’s a Word for It”) became a massive hit in the Gulf, featuring a video that scored over 25 million views on YouTube. “ نعمة الله ” (“God’s Blessing”), a duet with Iraqi singer-songwriter Abdullah al-Hameem, was a similarly successful follow-up with over 20 million views. On tour in Kuwait, however, she had to move from a hotel room she believed was haunted. At the end of 2016, she released لف ودور (“Turning and Turning”), written by Kuwaiti poet Abdulaziz al-Abkal, and got one million views in just four months.

References

21st-century Bahraini women singers
1991 births
Idols (franchise) participants
Living people